"You See the Trouble with Me" is a song recorded by American soul artist Barry White, written by White and Ray Parker Jr. It was released in February 1976 as the second single from White's album Let the Music Play. In its initial release, the track reached number 14 on Billboard's Black Singles chart, and number two in the United Kingdom. It was certified silver for 250,000 copies shipped in United Kingdom in 1976.

Track listing
European 7-inch single (1976)
 "You See The Trouble With Me" - 3:18
 "I'm So Blue And You Are Too" - 4:21

Charts

Certifications

Black Legend version

A cover version in 2000, credited to Italian musical group Black Legend, originally sampled Barry White; however, White had not given permission for this, so the vocals were re-recorded by Black Legend member Elroy "Spoonface" Powell. This 2000 version was a hit across Europe, reaching number one in the UK in June of that year. The song was the 40th-best-selling single of 2000 in the UK.

Track listing
 "You See the Trouble with Me" (We'll Be in Trouble radio edit) – 3:16
 "You See the Trouble with Me" (Sharam Jey Remix) – 6:25
 "You See the Trouble with Me" (We'll Be in Trouble original radio edit) – 4:58
 "Across the Ocean" (album version) – 5:44

Charts

Weekly charts

Year-end charts

Certifications

Release history

References

Barry White songs
1976 singles
1976 songs
2000 debut singles
20th Century Fox Records singles
Number-one singles in Scotland
Songs written by Barry White
Songs written by Ray Parker Jr.
UK Singles Chart number-one singles